Schloss Oranienstein is one of the palaces of the House of Orange-Nassau, sited at Diez on the Lahn. It was built on the ruins of Dierstein Abbey between 1672 and 1681 for Countess Albertine Agnes of Nassau after she was widowed.

After the French Republican invasion destroyed the Dutch Republic in 1795, stadtholder William V, Prince of Orange and his family first fled to England, before settling in Oranienstein for several years. Here, William and his son William Frederick issued the Oranienstein Letters, recognising the Batavian Republic and renouncing their stadtholderate and territorial claims in the Netherlands in return for financial and territorial compensation elsewhere, granted by First Consul Napoleon Bonaparte.

After the annexation of the Duchy of Nassau by Prussia in 1866, the palace was given to the Prussian army the following year. It is still today occupied by the Bundeswehr, together with adjacent barracks, but also houses a museum.

External links
http://www.museumdiez.de/content/2_14_Das-Museum-Nassau-Oranien-Diez.php

Oranienstein
House of Orange-Nassau